Little Nanay (International title: Little Mommy / ) is a Philippine television drama series broadcast by GMA Network. Directed by Ricky Davao, it stars Kris Bernal and Chlaui Malayao. It premiered on November 16, 2015 on the network's Telebabad line up replacing Beautiful Strangers. The series concluded on March 23, 2016 with a total of 93 episodes. It was replaced by Poor Señorita in its timeslot.

The series is streaming online on YouTube.

Premise
Miguel's daughter becomes estranged after living with Rey Batongbuhay to whom she conceived a daughter, Tinay who has a special condition. Despite the challenges brought about by her condition, she finds love and care through her grandparents, half-brothers and childhood friend Archie, who she develops an attachment which she mistakes for love. Tinay later gets impregnated by Archie leading to their marriage and raising their daughter Chiechie.

Cast and characters

Lead cast
 Kris Bernal as Celestina "Tinay" Vallejo Batongbuhay-San Pedro
 Chlaui Malayao as Chiechie Batongbuhay San Pedro

Supporting cast
 Nora Aunor as Annie Batongbuhay
 Bembol Roco as Berto Batongbuhay
 Mark Herras as Peter Parker Batongbuhay
 Juancho Trivino as Bruce Wayne Batongbuhay
 Keempee de Leon as Edgar San Pedro
 Gladys Reyes as Vivian San Pedro
 Hiro Peralta as Archie San Pedro
 Eddie Garcia as Miguel "Migz" Vallejo
 Sunshine Dizon as Helga Vallejo-Cubrador
 Renz Fernandez as Gerald Cruz
 Wynwyn Marquez as Beatrice

Recurring cast
 Paolo Contis as Stanley Cubrador
 Dexter Doria as Flor
 Rafa Siguion-Reyna as Botsok
 Faye Alhambra as Sophia Vallejo-Cubrador
 Jinri Park as Portia
 Christopher De Leon as August "Tisoy" D. Castañeda

Guest cast
 Jay Arcilla as Reggie Cubrador
 Stephanie Sol as Teacher Toni
 Rich Asuncion as Ma'am Janet
 Denise Barbacena as Trixie
 Abel Estanislao as Carlo
 Maey Bautista as Rubia
 Meryll Soriano as Judith Fajardo
 Lou Veloso as Kapitan
 Kitsi Pagaspas as Maria
 Sherilyn Reyes as Belen
 Abril Tomas as Leonora
 Leonora Cano as Yaya Elsa
 Meann Espinosa as Teresa
 Cesar Batistis as Pugok
 Julienn Mendoza as Kwekwek
 Kenneth Paul as Benjie
 Pauline Mendoza as Macy
 Pam Prinster as Jelsa 
 Judie dela Cruz as Jenny Cubrador
 Tiffany Yamut as Chiechie's classmate 
 Gwen Zamora as Lorna Vallejo-Batongbuhay
 Max Collins as a TV actress
 Ian De Leon as Reynaldo Batongbuhay
 Janine Gutierrez as Carmela Villon-Batongbuhay
 Dianne Medina as Cindy Cruz (Gerald's wife)
 Alessandra de Rossi as Eunice (Beatrice's sister)
 Will Ashley de Leon as young Peter
 Zymic Jaranilla as young Bruce
 Sachi Manahan as young Tinay
 Carol Pelicano as a vegetable vendor

Ratings
According to AGB Nielsen Philippines' Mega Manila household television ratings, the pilot episode of Little Nanay earned a 22.7% rating. While the final episode scored a 24.2% rating.

Accolades

References

External links
 
 

2015 Philippine television series debuts
2016 Philippine television series endings
Filipino-language television shows
GMA Network drama series
Television shows set in the Philippines